Pourquoi l'étrange Monsieur Zolock s'intéressait-il tant à la bande dessinée? ("Why was the strange Mr. Zolock so interested in comics?") is a Canadian docufiction film, released in 1983. A documentary about comic books and graphic novels, the film features interviews with comics illustrators wrapped by a fictional frame story in which Monsieur Zolock (Jean-Louis Millette), an evil supervillain, hires private investigator Dieudonné (Michel Rivard) to investigate the cultural influence of comics as part of his plot to take over the world.

The film won the Genie Award for Best Feature Length Documentary at the 5th Genie Awards in 1984.

References

External links 
 

1983 films
1983 documentary films
Best Documentary Film Genie and Canadian Screen Award winners
Films directed by Yves Simoneau
Canadian docufiction films
French-language Canadian films
1980s Canadian films
1980s French-language films